David Craig may refer to:

David Craig (Northern Irish footballer) (born 1966),, Retired Northern Irish footballer who played for Newcastle  United playing at right back
David Craig (Scottish footballer) (born 1969)
David Craig (Australian footballer) (born 1953), Australian rules footballer
David Craig, Baron Craig of Radley (born 1929), retired British Chief of the Defence Staff and Marshal of the RAF
David Craig (author), British former management consultant and writer criticising management consultancy
David R. Craig (born 1949), American politician
David P. Craig (1919–2015), Australian scientist
David Craig (Wisconsin politician) (born 1979), American politician
David W. Craig, commander of the Canadian Forces Naval Reserve
David Craig, a pseudonym of the Welsh writer James Tucker (born 1929)
David Millar Craig (1878–1965), BBC's first Controller for Scotland

See also
Craig David (born 1981), singer